San Gennaro usually refers to St Januarius, bishop of Naples.

San Gennaro may also refer to:

 Festival, Fair, or Feast of San Gennaro: September 19
 San Gennaro, a grape
 Cathedral of San Gennaro in Naples
 San Gennaro extra Moenia ("San Gennaro-beyond-the-Walls"), a church in Naples
 Royal Chapel of the Treasure of San Gennaro in Naples
 Museum of the Treasure of San Gennaro in Naples
 San Gennaro al Vomero, a church in Naples
 San Gennaro all’Olmo, a former church in Naples
 Catacombs of San Gennaro in Naples
 Abbey of San Gennaro:
 Abbey of San Gennaro in Cervinara (est. c. 1100), now dedicated to Our Lady of Sorrows
  in Capolona (est. 972)
 San Gennaro dei Poveri ("San Gennaro of the Poor"), a hospital in Naples
 Porta San Gennaro ("San Gennaro Gate") in Naples
 San Gennaro Vesuviano, a village near Naples
 Order of San Gennaro, a knightly order headed by the titular King of Naples, a member of the Spanish royal family
 Spanish ship San Gennaro (1765), a Spanish 86-gun ship of the line ceded to France, where it served as the Tourville

See also
 Januarius, the latinate form of the name
 January, the anglicized form of the name
 Gennaro, the italicized form of the name
 Treasure of San Gennaro, an Italian comedy
 San Gennaro's Blood (San Gennaro Vére), a novel set in Naples

"gennaro" also refers to the month January in italian